is a Japanese architect and director of her own firm, Kazuyo Sejima & Associates. In 1995, she co-founded the firm SANAA (Sejima + Nishizawa & Associates). In 2010, Sejima was the second woman to receive the Pritzker Prize, which was awarded jointly with Nishizawa.

Early life and education
Sejima was born on 29 October 1956 in Mito, Ibaraki, Japan. She graduated from Japan Women's University in 1979. She then went on to complete the Master's Degree course in architecture in 1981. In the same year, she began working with the architecture firm Toyo Ito and Associates until 1987.

Career
After apprenticing with Toyo Ito, Sejima established Kazuyo Sejima & Associates in 1987. One of her first hires was Ryue Nishizawa, a student who had worked with Sejima at Toyo Ito and Associates. After working for Sejima for several years, Sejima asked him to form a partnership. In 1995, the two founded the Tokyo-based firm SANAA (Sejima and Nishizawa and Associates). In 2010, Sejima was appointed director of architecture sector for the Venice Biennale, which she curated for the 12th Annual International Architecture Exhibition. She was the first woman ever selected for this position. In 2010, she was awarded the Pritzker Prize, together with Ryue Nishizawa.

Major works 

 Saishunkan Seiyaku Women's Dormitory, Kumamoto, Japan (1990-1991)
 Competition for Nasunogahara Harmony Hall (1991)
 Competition for Chuya Nakahara Memorial Museum (1992)
 Gifu Kitagata Apartment, Gifu, Japan (1994)
 Multi Media Studio, Ōgaki, Gifu, Japan (1995)
 Competition for New Campus Center for Illinois Institute of Technology (1997-1998)
 'De Kunstlinie' Theatre and Cultural Centre, Almere, Netherlands (1998-2007)
 SANAA’s 21st Century Museum of Contemporary Art, Kanazawa, Japan (1999-2004)
 Isetan, Tokyo, Japan (2000)
 Lee Garden, Hong Kong, China (2000-2001)
 House in Plum Grove (2001-2003)
 Glass Pavilion of the Toledo Museum of Art, Toledo, Ohio, USA (2001-2006)
 Extension of the Institut Valencià d'Art Modern (IVAM), Valencia, Spain (2002–present)
 DIOR Tokyo Omotesando Store, Tokyo, Japan (2003)
 Bairin no le, Japan (2003)
 Zollverein School of Management and Design, Essen, Germany (2003-2006)
 Naoshima Ferry Terminal, Naoshima, Kagawa, Japan (2003-2006)
 New Museum of Contemporary Art, New York City, USA (2003-2007)
 Towada Art Center, Towada, Japan (2005-2008)
 Rolex Learning Center, École Polytechnique Fédérale de Lausanne (EPFL), Switzerland (2005-2009)
 Inujima Art House project, Okayama, Japan (began 2008)
 Serpentine Pavilion at Serpentine Galleries, London, UK (2009)
 Louvre-Lens in Lens, France (2012)
 La Samaritaine in Paris, France (2020)

Further reading 

 Alonso Provencio, Marta, Almazán Caballero, Jorge. Designing the process: scale models in the work of Kazuyo Sejima and Sou Fujimoto. In: ArchNet-IJAR, 2011, vol. 5, n° 1, p. 22-36.

Bibliography
GA (2005). Sejima Kazuyo + Nishizawa Ryue Dokuhon. A.D.A. Edita. 
GA (2005). GA ARCHITECT 18 Sejima Kazuyo + Nishizawa Ryue. A.D.A. Edita. 
Yuko Hasegawa (2005). Kazuyo Sejima + Ryue Nishizawa / SANAA, Electa. 
Yuko Hasegawa (2006). Kazuyo Sejima + Ryue Nishizawa: SANAA. Phaidon Press. 
 Agustin Perez Rubio (2007). SANAA Houses: Kazuyo Sejima + Ryue Nishizawa. Actar. 
Joseph Grima and Karen Wong (Eds) (2008) Shift: SANAA and the New Museum. Lars Müller Publishers. 
Thomas Daniell (2008). After the Crash: Architecture in Post-Bubble Japan. Princeton Architectural Press.

Awards and honours
 1989 – Special Prize for Residential Architecture, Tokyo Architecture Association
 1990 – SD Prize, SD Review
 1992 – Second Prize, Commercial Space Design Award
 1995 – Kenneth F. Brown Asia Pacific Culture and Architecture Design Award, the University of Hawaii (for Saishunkan Seiyaku Women’s Dormitory) 98oi
 2005 – Rolf Schock Prize in Visual Arts
 2010 – Pritzker Prize
 2019 – Prix Versailles World Judge
 2022 – Praemium Imperiale award for architecture

See also

Women in architecture

References

External links

 SANAA Official Website 
2010 Pritzker prize
Ryue Nishizawa and Kazuyo Sejima win 2010 Pritzker Architecture Prize fastcompany.com

1956 births
Living people
20th-century Japanese architects
Pritzker Architecture Prize winners
Rolf Schock Prize laureates
Japanese women architects
21st-century Japanese architects
Members of the American Academy of Arts and Letters
Japan Women's University alumni